The 3 November 1975 Bangladesh coup d'état was a military coup d'état led by Major General Khaled Mosharraf to remove the assassins of Sheikh Mujibur Rahman from power.

Background
The President of Bangladesh, Sheikh Mujibur Rahman, was assassinated in the 15 August 1975 Bangladesh coup d'état by disgruntled Bangladesh Army officers led by Major Syed Faruque Rahman. Sheikh Mujibur Rahman led Bangladesh through the 1971 Bangladesh Liberation war. He was the founding President of Bangladesh and leader of the Mujibnagar government (the Bangladeshi government in exile). Following the Bangladesh famine of 1974 he formed a special security force, Rakhi Bahini, and created a one-party state, BAKSAL. The measures taken by Sheikh Mujibur Rahman were not popular in Bangladesh. Khondaker Mostaq Ahmad was the Minister of Commerce in the cabinet of Sheikh Mujibur Rahman. After the Assassination of Sheikh Mujibur Rahman he, with the support of the army officers involved in the coup, declared himself the President of Bangladesh.

Brigadier General Khaled Mosharraf was a Bengali officer in the Pakistan Army. He joined the Mukti Bahini after the start of Bangladesh Liberation war. He was a sector commander. He was appointed by the Mujibnagar government to lead Sector 2 of the Mukti Bahini. He survived a bullet wound to his head during the war and was provided treatment in Lucknow, India. After Bangladesh became an independent country, he was awarded Bir Uttam by the government of Bangladesh for his role in the war. In 1975, he was serving as the Chief of general staff of Bangladesh army.

Events
After the assassination of Sheikh Mujibur Rahman, the assassins had established their government based in Bangabhaban (the Presidential Palace) under Khondaker Mostaq Ahmad. On 3 November 1975, Brigadier General Khaled Mosharraf launched a coup to remove the assassins from power and Khondaker Mostaq Ahmad from the Presidency. Khaled Mosharraf was being supported by Colonel Shafaat Jamil, the brigade commander of 46th Independent Infantry Brigade based in Dhaka. They were worried about Army discipline with junior mutinous officers issuing orders from the Presidential palace. Khaled Mosharraf and the Army Chief, Ziaur Rahman, disagreed on when to remove the rebels from power. Khaled wanted it to be done as soon as possible while Zia wanted to wait till heavy armours are removed from the Presidential Palace. He used helicopters of Bangladesh Air Force to scare the rebels held up in the Presidential Palace.

As it appeared a military confrontation was imminent, Muhammad Ghulam Tawab, the chief of the Air Force was able convince the rebels to negotiate their way out of power and the Presidential palace. Muhammad Ghulam Tawab was appointed to his position by the rebels after the assassination of Sheikh Mujibur Rahman. The rebels agreed on the conditions that they be provided safe passage to Thailand. On 3 November 1975, before the rebels went on exile, they killed four Bangladesh Awami League leaders in jail. The four leaders were Syed Nazrul Islam, former vice president and acting president of Bangladesh, Tajuddin Ahmad, former prime minister of Bangladesh, Muhammad Mansur Ali, former prime minister of Bangladesh, and Abul Hasnat Muhammad Qamaruzzaman, former home minister of Bangladesh. Khaled Mosharraf ordered the arrests of K.M. Obaidur Rahman, Nurul Islam Manzur, Shah Moazzam Hossain, and Taheruddin Thakur, they were Bangladesh Awami League politicians who had aligned themselves  with Khondaker Mostaq Ahmad. On 4 November 1975, Khaled was to promoted to Major General and made the Chief of Army Staff. Ziaur Rahman was retired from service and placed under house arrest in Dhaka Cantonment. Justice Abu Sadat Mohammad Sayem, the chief Justice of Bangladesh, was made president and replaced Khondaker Mostaq Ahmad.

Major General Khaled Mosharraf was killed in the 7 November 1975 Bangladesh coup d'état led by Colonel Abu Taher with the support of Jatiya Samajtantrik Dal. Colonel Najmul Huda and Lieutenant Colonel Abu Taher Mohammad Haider were also killed in the coup. The officers were visiting the 10th East Bengal Regiment when they were killed by the soldiers of the regiment. The Coup also freed and reinstated General Ziaur Rahman.

Legacy

In Bangladesh 3 November is remembered as Jail Killing day due to the Killing of the four leaders in Dhaka Central Jail.

References

1970s coups d'état and coup attempts
1975 crimes in Bangladesh
1975 in Bangladesh
Military coups in Bangladesh
November 1975 events in Asia
1975 in military history
Violence in Bangladesh
Mutinies
Military history of Bangladesh
History of Bangladesh (1971–present)
1970s in Dhaka